Major General Alfred Frederick Ahner (November 12, 1921 – September 23, 2010) was an Indiana National Guard officer who served for 15 years as the state's Adjutant General.

Ahner was born in Huntington, Indiana, and was a graduate of Indiana Central College (B.A., 1947) and Butler University (M.S., 1951). He enlisted in the Army Enlisted Reserve Corps on August 22, 1942 and served in World War II as a 1st Lieutenant, and was the first De-Nazification Officer in the American Zone of Vienna, Austria.

After serving as a full-time staff officer with the Indiana Guard, Ahner was appointed as Adjutant General in 1960 by Governor Harold Handley.  Governor Edgar Whitcomb also appointed MG Ahner in 1972, and he served until his retirement in 1986.  MG Ahner served in that position longer than any other Adjutant General in the state's history, a total of 15 years, under 4 governors.

Awards and decorations 
During his military service he was awarded: Legion of Merit, Meritorious Service Medal, Commendation Ribbon with Medal Pendant, Good Conduct Medal, American Campaign Medal, European Theatre Medal with Three Battle Stars for Ground Combat in Rhineland, Ardennes-Alsace and Central Europe, World War II Victory Medal, Army Occupation Medal-Germany, Armed Forces Reserve Medal, Army Reserve Components Achievement Medal, National Guard Minute Man Award, Certificate of Commendation from General Mark Clark, Indiana Distinguished Service Medal, Indiana Commendation Medal with Oak Leaf Cluster, Indiana Long Service Medal, Indiana Volunteer Emblem, Indiana Emergency Service Ribbon, Army National Guard Recruiter Badge, Selective Service System Meritorious Service Award and NGAUS Distinguished Service Medal.

References 

1921 births
2010 deaths
People from Huntington, Indiana
United States Army personnel of World War II
United States Army officers
American expatriates in Austria
University of Indianapolis alumni
Indiana National Guard personnel
Butler University alumni
Recipients of the Meritorious Service Medal (United States)
National Guard (United States) generals
Recipients of the Legion of Merit
Adjutants General of Indiana